Engaeus nulloporius is a species of crayfish in the family Parastacidae. It is endemic to Australia.

Sources

Doran, N. and Horwitz, P. 2010. Engaeus nulloporius. The IUCN Red List of Threatened Species 2010. Retrieved 5 February 2017.

External links 
Atlas of Living Australia website

Parastacidae
Freshwater crustaceans of Australia
Taxonomy articles created by Polbot
Crustaceans described in 1990